Srivani Jade is an Indian classical vocalist

Notable recordings
 Night by Night—Khayals in Jogkauns and Sohni 
 Salagvarali and Audav Bageshree—Khayals
 Meera's Love
 Bhoopali and Rajasthani Maand
 Bhaktidarshana Tukayache (Marathi Abhangs of Sant Tukaram)

Awards and recognitions
 2012: Individual Artist Project grant from 4Culture (Project title: “Raag-rang: A Musical Interpretation of Modern Indian-Style Miniature Paintings.”)
 2009: “Meera's Love” was nominated for Best Album at 10th Annual Independent Music Awards in the World Music category
 2009: Fellowship Award from Washington State Arts Commission.
 2009: Recording grant from Jack Straw Productions for project on the spiritual love songs of the 16th century mystic, Meera Bai.
 2009–10: Washington State Arts Commission Master-Apprentice grant (Khayal).
 2008–09: Washington State Arts Commission Master-Apprentice grant  (Thumri).

References

1975 births
Hindustani singers
Indian women classical singers
Living people
21st-century Indian singers
21st-century Indian women singers